Amanda Prantera (born 23 April 1942) is a British novelist who has been living in Italy since the age of 20. She is the author of a number of novels which vary from metaphysical fantasies to contemporary thrillers set in her adopted home of Italy.

Publications
Strange Loop (1984)
The Cabalist (1985)
Conversations with Lord Byron on perversion, 163 years after His Lordship’s death  (1986)
The Side of the Moon (1991)
Proto Zoë (1992)
The Young Italians (1993)
The Kingdom of Fanes (1995)
Zoë Trope (1996)
Letter to Lorenzo (1999)
Don Giovanna (2000)
Capri file (2001)
Spoiler (2003)
Sabine (2005)
The Loft [Translator] (2011)
Wolfsong (2012)
Peter and the Egg (2013)
Nowhere Ending Sky [Translator] (2013)
Mohawk's Brood (2014)

References

External links

British writers
1942 births
Living people
Place of birth missing (living people)